Grand Ayatollah Sheikh Mohammad-Hossein Naini Gharavi (May 25, 1860 – August 14, 1936) was Iranian Shia marja'. 

His father Mirza Abdol Rahim and grandfather Haji Mirza Saeed, both one were Sheikhs of Nain and Mohammad Hussein proved himself the most competent student of Ayatollah Kazem Khorasani. Ayatollah Naini is considered to be the most famous theoretician of Iran's Constitutional Revolution. He died in 1936 and was buried next to shrine of Imam Ali in Iraq. Among his works, notable references are his Dubios Habit, Vassilat'un Nijat, and Ressalat la Zarar. 50th death anniversary of Ayatollah Mirza Mohammed Hussein Naini was memorialized by issue of Stamps Tickets, in Iran, in 1987.

Biography  
Mirza Muhammad Hossein Naini was born to a respected and religious family of Nain on 25 May 1860  ( 15 Dzulqadah 1276 Lunar Hijrah ). His father Mirza Abdol Rahim and grandfather Haji Mirza Saeed, both one after another were Sheikhs of Nain. Ayatollah Muhammad Hussein Naini, who is better known as Mirza Naini, did his primary studies in Nain and then in 1877 when he was 17 years old, moved to Isfahan. Here he lived with Haji Shaikh Muhammad Baqir Isfahani for seven years. The latter belonged to a distinguished clerical family of Isfahan and was himself the most powerful Mujtahid of that city. After completing basic education he moved to Najaf, Iraq, to achieve the degree of Ijtihad. He proved himself the most competent student of Ayatollah Kazem Khorasani Ayatollah Naini is considered to be the most famous theoretician of Iran's Constitutional Revolution.

Ideas and Action

Defending democracy 
One major concern of Akhund Khurasani and other Marja's was to familiarize the public with the ideas of a democratic nation-state and modern constitution. Akhund Khurasani asked Iranian scholars to deliver sermons on the subject to clarify doubts seeded by Nuri and his comrades. His close associate and student, who later rose to the rank of Marja, Muhammad Hussain Naini, wrote a book, “Tanbih al-Ummah wa Tanzih al-Milla”(), to counter the propaganda of Nuri group.   He devoted many pages to distinguish between tyrannical and democratic regimes. In democracies, power is distributed and limited through constitution. He maintained that in the absence of Imam Mahdi, all governments are doomed to be imperfect and unjust, and therefore people had to prefer the bad over the worse. Hence, the constitutional democracy was the best option to help improve the condition of the society as compared to absolutism, and run the worldly affairs with consultation and better planning. he saw the elected members of the parliament as representatives of the people, not deputies of the Imam, hence they didn't need a religious justification for their authority. He said that both the “tyrannical Ulema” and the radical societies who promoted majoritarianism were a threat to both Islam and democracy. The people should avoid the destructive, corrupt and divisive forces and maintain national unity. He devoted large section of his book to definition and condemnation of religious tyranny. He then went on to defend people's freedom of opinion and expression, equality of all citizens in eyes of the nation-state regardless of their religion, separation of the legislative, executive and judicial powers, accountability of the King, people's right to share power.

Pupils 

Names of the some students benefited from the teaching of Mirza Naini, includes the following scholars and clerics of their time:
1.	Sheikh Mohammad Ali Kazemi Khorassani
2.	Seyyed Mohsen Tabatabai Hakim.
3.	Grand Ayotollah Khoei.
4.	Seyyed Mohammad Hossein Tabatabai
5.	Grand Ayatollah Taqi Bahjat
6.  Sayyed Hadi Milani
7.  Sayyed Jamal Al din Golpayegani
8.  Sheikh Muhammad Ali Kazemini
9.  Sheikh Mousa Khansari
10. Syed Ali Naqi Naqvi

Rationality claims merit not the relation 
Among the modern Usuliyan Shia scholars Mirza Naini is regarded as one of the founders of modern principles of jurisprudence. Intellectual development in term of social progress of science can be observed between Mirza Naini and his reverenced Master Ayatollah Kazem Khorasani, which establishes the fact that difference of opinion is not the cause of hostilities the very basis of battle is ignorance. His master represents Sadrian Islamic thought. Defending principles of "Sadrian philosophy", with his full support to Sadrian view in the interpretation of causality and its relation to freedom. On the other side, his intelligent pupil (Mirza Naini) was one of the strong critics of Sadrian view. In a new way and method, he criticized the Sadrian philosophical thought and presented a new viewpoint on the relation between causality and human freedom.

Naini as a politician 
Ayatollah Naini was active both in the Persian Constitutional Revolution and in Iraqi politics. As a politician his principal view with regard to form of government is very clear.
He suggested the form of government by an infallible ruler fully responsible to the will of God, which might be able to safeguard the interests of people. Such type of ruling is not possible in the era of major occultation of Imam Mahdi. Therefore, efforts should be made to arrange the ruling of just and honest men with duty to control the government, directly responsible to the will of God through Imam Mahdi. He further argued that in such a situation it is the known fact that access to leaders with such respected characteristics’ becomes unquestionable and people usually have no say over such matters, it is thus obligatory to observe the following two principles:
1. To implement law
2. To appoint wise men as "supervisors"
Obviously these were the possible steps for removal of huge gap between the existing situation and the desired goals of forming progressive government for the betterment of people.

Works 
Mirza Naini being an expert on Usul al Fiqh was the first human being in the history of Iran to construe the idea of religious dictatorship. Naini stressed the concept of Aql (dialectic reasoning) and believed that Islam was compatible with progress. He also argued that the most intolerable form of autocracy is the tyranny imposed by a religious state. He had written a book Tanbih al-Ummah wa Tanzih Al-Milla (the awakening of the community and refinement of the nations) which was translated into Arabic by Salih Kashi al Gheta and published in 1909 by the Institute of Strategic Studies in Baghdad. His book mainly relates to theory of constitutional revolution with his deliberations on the major topics of “Ignorance and Despotism”. In his book, he discussed interalia, the view that freedom of the pen and speech both are God given freedom necessary for liberation from despotism (taghut). Elaborating his view and in replying to opponents of Constitutionalism he pointed out that Islamic Law has two distinct categories: the primary laws are based on the Quran and other known Islamic principles, were unchangeable. The secondary laws, in contrast, were subject to change, depending on temporal and spatial circumstances, making them the proper sphere for legislation.

Exile 
At  the beginning of World War-I, the Shiite Scholars and clerics of Iraq were not the supporter of allied powers, however, they entered the scene and declared holy war against the Central power. Consequently, Mirza Naini was exiled with Abul Hassan Isfahani to Iran. They were welcome and received by Abdul-Karim Ha'eri Yazdi, the then head of Feizieh religious school. However, after a short stay Naini was allowed for his return to Iraq with advice not to be involved in politics.

Death
Ayatollah Mirza Hussain Naini died in 1936 at the age of 76. He is buried in Najaf.

See also 
Iranian Constitutional Revolution 
Intellectual movements in Iran
Mohammad-Kazem Khorasani

Bibliography

References

External links

1860 births
1936 deaths
19th-century Iranian politicians
Iranian Shia clerics
People of the Persian Constitutional Revolution
Burials at Imam Ali Mosque
Pupils of Muhammad Kadhim Khorasani
20th-century Iranian politicians